Lorson is a surname. Notable people with the surname include:

Gerhard Lorson (1919–1992), German chess master
Laura Lorson, American radio producer
Mary Lorson, American singer-songwriter

See also
Larson (surname)
Korson
Morson